Tukmeerpur is a census town in North East district in the Indian state of Delhi.Pradhan of Tukmeerpur gaon 
Ch. Joginder Pradhan

Demographics
 India census, Mirpur Turk had a population of 28,257. Males constitute 54% of the population and females 46%. Mirpur Turk has an average literacy rate of 63%, higher than the national average of 59.5%: male literacy is 71%, and female literacy is 54%. In Mirpur Turk, 17% of the population is under 6 years of age. Tukmirpur is part of dedha chubisi i.e group of 24 dedha gurjars village. Near by dedha villages are Biharipur, Sherpur Gujran, dayalpur, sadatpur gujran, sabhapur, Illachipur, garhi mandu, khajoori khas, Gamri, Ghonda, Usmanpur, Moujpur,

References

Cities and towns in North East Delhi district